Leslie Libman is an American television director. She also directed commercials and music videos.

Television work
Since 1995 she works primarily as a TV director on a number of television series, most notably directing multiple episodes of Homicide: Life on the Street, The 4400 and NCIS. Other series include The Wire, Oz and The Shield. For MTV she created and directed with her late husband, Larry Williams, Out of Order, a series of six original short films.

She co-directed with Larry Williams two television movies - in 1997 the HBO TV movie Path to Paradise: The Untold Story of the World Trade Center Bombing (starring Peter Gallagher and Art Malik) and the 1998 TV adaptation of Aldous Huxley's Brave New World (again starring Gallagher with Leonard Nimoy) for the USA Network.

In 2003 she directed the ABC TV movie The Extreme Team (aka The X-Team).

Other work
Before moving to television work, Libman and Williams formed a directing team creating commercials (among others for American Express, Christian Dior, McDonald's, Panasonic and Sony) and music clips (Boy George, The Church, Al Green, Ziggy Marley & The Melody Makers and more). Without Williams, she directed music videos for The Bangles, Bee Gees, Chicago, Michael McDonald, Roy Orbison, and Rod Stewart and others.

Filmography

Television
Director

References

External links
 

Living people
American television directors
American music video directors
American women television directors
Television commercial directors
Place of birth missing (living people)
Year of birth missing (living people)